The West Avenue – Roberts Street Residential Historic District in Lavonia, Georgia is a  historic district which was listed on the National Register of Historic Places in 1983.  The listing included 23 contributing buildings (houses) and a contributing site (a city park).

The houses are mostly brick Craftsman bungalows or wood-frame Victorian cottages.  The Judge Allen house at the corner of Roberts Street and Augusta Road, a one-a-half-story house, is one of the most distinguished.  It has multiple gables, with dentil molding in the front gable, and fanlight windows.

References

Historic districts on the National Register of Historic Places in Georgia (U.S. state)
National Register of Historic Places in Franklin County, Georgia
Victorian architecture in Georgia (U.S. state)